The 2011–12 season is Omonia's 57th season in the Cypriot First Division and 63rd year in existence as a football club. On 22 June, the first training session for the season took place at GSP Stadium. The pre-season tour this season was in Poland. The team entered the 2011–12 UEFA Europa League third qualifying round on 28 July and won the first leg in Cyprus against ADO Den Haag. One week later, they eliminated the Dutch team and were drawn against Red Bull Salzburg in the play-off round. A comeback and a 2–1 win and the team still had the chance to advance to the group stages. Omonia lost 0–1 in Austria and were eliminated on the away goals rule. Omonia won the Cypriot Cup last season and therefore played in the Cypriot Super Cup on 7 August against the rivals APOEL but the team lost 0–1.

Current squad
Last Update: January 28, 2012

   

For recent transfers, see List of Cypriot football transfers summer 2011.
 Also, see List of Cypriot football transfers winter 2011–12.

Squad changes

In:

Out:

Club

Captains
  Constantinos Makrides
  Christos Karipidis
  Leandro Marcolini Pedroso de Almeida

Competitions

Pre-season

Laiki Bank League

Classification

Results summary

Results by round

Disciplinary records

Matches
Kick-off times are in UTC+2.

Second round

Group A

Matches

UEFA Europa League

Third qualifying round

Omonia won 3-1 on aggregate.

Play-off round

Red Bull Salzburg 2–2 Omonia on aggregate. Red Bull Salzburg won on away goals.

LTV Super Cup

Cypriot Cup

Second round

Omonia won 10-1 on aggregate.

Quarter-finals

Omonia won 9-0 on aggregate.

Semi-finals

Omonia won 3-1 on aggregate.

Final

AC Omonia seasons
Omonia
Omonia